The White Tiger (Chinese: 白虎, Pinyin: Báihǔ), known in Chinese as Baihu, is one of the Four Symbols of the Chinese constellations. It is sometimes called the White Tiger of the West. It represents the west in terms of direction and the autumn season. It is known as Byakko in Japanese, Baekho in Korean, and Bạch Hổ in Vietnamese.

Seven Mansions
As with the other three Symbols, there are seven astrological "Mansions" (positions of the Moon) within the White Tiger. The names and determinative stars are:

Origin
According to legend, the tiger's tail would turn white when it reached the age of 500 years. In this way, the white tiger became a kind of mythological creature. It was said that the white tiger would only appear when the emperor ruled with absolute virtue or if there was peace throughout the world. Because the color white of the Wu Xing theory also represents the west, the White Tiger became a mythological Guardian Of The West.

Worship
During the Han Dynasty, there was the old custom of worshipping the White Tiger God on the 14th of the first lunar month in Huiji, Zhejiang, at Baihu Temple, one of the four Weiyang Temples. According to textual research, the worship of the white tiger appears in the ancient Qiang Rong peoples. To this day, the Yi, Bai, Buyi and Tujia nationalities in China still call the white tiger its ancestor, calling themselves "Liba" and "Baidi Tianwang", believing the star of the White Tiger to have descended to the world where it gave birth to seven men and women.

In Chinese art, the white tiger often appears with the dragon. The white tiger symbolizes power and army. Therefore, many things named after the white tiger in ancient times are related to military affairs, such as the white tiger flag in ancient army and the symbol that can command the army.

See also
Cetus in Chinese astronomy
Chinese culture
Feng shui
I Ching
Byakkotai

References

Chinese constellations
Chinese gods
Chinese legendary creatures
Guardians of the directions
Mythological tigers
Tigers in popular culture
Four Symbols
Onmyōdō deities